Reminiscences of a Journey to Lithuania is a 1972 documentary film by Jonas Mekas. It revolves around Mekas' trip back to Semeniškiai, the village of his birth. It was Mekas' second diary film, which narrates through highly personal footage and voiceover the Mekas brothers’ visit to their native Lithuanian village of Semeniškiai, Panevėžys in 1971 after a 27-year absence.

Reminiscences of a Journey to Lithuania is now part of Anthology Film Archives' Essential Cinema Repertory collection. In 2006, the film was selected to the National Film Registry by the Library of Congress, for its "cultural, aesthetic, or historical significance".

References

External links
 Reminiscences of a Journey to Lithuania at the Film-Makers' Cooperative
 

1972 documentary films
1972 films
Autobiographical documentary films
British documentary films
Films directed by Jonas Mekas
Films set in Lithuania
Films shot in Lithuania
United States National Film Registry films
West German films
Films about Lithuanian-American culture
1970s British films